Prince Haji 'Abdul 'Azim of Brunei (29 July 1982 – 24 October 2020) was the second-born prince of Hassanal Bolkiah, Sultan of Brunei. He was fourth in line to succeed the throne of Brunei until his death on 24 October 2020.

Early life and education
Prince Azim was born in Bandar Seri Begawan, Brunei on 29 July 1982. He was the second-born child of the Sultan of Brunei, Sultan Hassanal Bolkiah, and Pengiran Isteri Hajah Mariam. He was educated at International School Brunei, Raffles Institution, and Oxford Brookes University.

Post-university 
In 2008, Prince Azim was sent to attend the nine-month officer training course at the Royal Military Academy Sandhurst, but he dropped out after one week.

In 2009, he designed unisex weekend bags for MCM. The proceeds went to the Make A Wish Foundation UK, a charity in which he is one of the patrons.

In May 2011, at a charity show in Brunei Darussalam, held at the Empire Hotel and Country Club's Indera Samudra Hall at which 31 persons with autism performed, Prince Azim said that those with autism should be treated with respect, "as would to any of your family members". On 27 April 2013 at the opening of the 2nd ASEAN Autism Network (AAN) Congress, he urged that appropriate support be given to families with autistic family members.

He was a producer with the London-based film company Daryl Prince Productions which produced You're Not You.  The implementation of sharia law by his father was poorly received in Hollywood and led to a boycott of properties owned by Brunei.  Azim is thought to have cancelled his attendance at a party for buyers of You're Not You because of the controversy. He was a prominent figure of the international jetset.  Prince Azim was reported to have had a net worth of US$5 billion at the time of his death.

In April 2019 Prince Azim was outed as gay by blogger Perez Hilton, in response to the Sultan of Brunei's introduction of Sharia law, which included the death penalty for gay people. Prince Azim responded by saying that he didn't mind being outed, but he was concerned that it "probably hurt a few people in the community".

Prince Azim was an advocate for the arts and creative industries and championed and donated to several causes around youth and people with disabilities.

Death
Prince Azim died on 24 October 2020 at the Jerudong Park Medical Centre in Jerudong following a long battle against an undisclosed illness. He was 38 years old at the time of his death. The official announcement of his death was made later on the day he died. The government of Brunei also announced a seven-day period of mourning and ordered all national flags be lowered to half-mast.

He was laid to rest beside his grandfather, Sultan Omar Ali Saifuddien III, at the Royal Mausoleum in Bandar Seri Begawan after the Asar prayers.

His funeral and burial ceremony was attended by the Brunei Royal Family, state dignitaries and cabinet ministers. Among the foreign guests who were present to give their last respects was Tunku Ismail Idris as representative of the Sultan of Johor.

A day after his death, the Sultan of Johor ordered all state flags in the state of Johor be lowered to half-mast in respect of the late prince.

Some celebrities on social media like Daniel Lismore and Janet Jackson offered their condolences.

On 27 October 2020, his brother Prince Mateen released a post on Instagram that stated that the cause of death was multiple organ failure which was caused by severe systemic vasculitis which Prince Azim was diagnosed with early into 2020.

Honours 

  Order of the Crown of Brunei (DKMB)
 Sultan Hassanal Bolkiah Medal (PHBS)
 Golden Jubilee Medal – (5 October 2017)

 Silver Jubilee Medal – (5 October 1992)

Ancestry

References

External links
 
 

1982 births
2020 deaths
People from Bandar Seri Begawan
Bruneian people of Arab descent
Bruneian people of Japanese descent
Bruneian people of English descent
Bruneian royalty
Alumni of Oxford Brookes University
Graduates of the Royal Military Academy Sandhurst
Raffles Institution alumni
Bruneian film producers
Deaths from multiple organ failure
Deaths from vasculitis
LGBT royalty
Gay men
LGBT film producers
LGBT in Brunei
Sons of monarchs
People with bipolar disorder
Bruneian_LGBT_people